Willink is a Dutch toponymic surname. Notable people with the surname include:

Abraham Willink (1920–1998), Dutch-Argentine entomologist
Arthur Willink (1850–1913), British theologian and clergyman
Carel Willink (1900–1983), Dutch painter
Charles Willink (1929–2009), English classical scholar, teacher and baronet, son of Henry
Henry Willink PC, MC, KC (1894–1973), British politician, public servant and baronet
Herman Tjeenk Willink (born 1942), politician
Jocko Willink (born 1971), American podcaster, author and retired United States Navy SEAL
John Willink (1858–1927), Anglican Dean
Mathilde Willink (1938–1977), Dutch socialite and wife of Carel Willink
Wilhem Ferdinand Willink van Collen (1847–1881), Dutch painter who funded an arts award
Willem Willink (1750–1841), Dutch merchant, investor in the Holland Land Company and the Louisiana Purchase
Herman Tjeenk Willink (born 1942), Dutch politician

See also
Willink, New York, former town in Western New York, USA, named after Willem Willink
The Willink School, Berkshire school
Willink baronets of Dingle Bank in the City of Liverpool, a title in the Baronetage of the United Kingdom

References

Dutch-language surnames
Dutch toponymic surnames